The Tarbat Ness Lighthouse is located at the North West tip of the Tarbat Ness peninsula near the fishing village of Portmahomack on the east coast of Scotland.

History

At the Battle of Tarbat Ness in the 11th century, Thorfinn the Mighty defeated "Karl Hundason", possibly a Viking name for Macbeth.

Further down the peninsula at Portmahomack, in the 1480s the Clan Ross slaughtered a raiding party from the Clan Mackay by locking them in the Tarbat Old Church and setting fire to it. This event is known as the Battle of Tarbat.

Lighthouse

A storm in the Moray Firth in November 1826 saw the loss of 16 vessels and brought many applications for lighthouses to be constructed at Tarbat Ness and at Covesea Skerries.

Tarbat Ness Lighthouse was engineered by Robert Stevenson for the Northern Lighthouse Board and the light was first exhibited on 26 January 1830. James Smith of Inverness was the contractor responsible for the building of the lighthouse which cost £9,361. The lighthouse tower is the third tallest in Scotland behind North Ronaldsay and Skerryvore and is notable for having two distinguishing broad red bands.

Bella Bathurst's 1999 'The Lighthouse Stevensons' refers to a rescue made by the principal keeper William Davidson of 4 of the 5 crew members of a Norwegian schooner. No date given for this. She mentions this in the context that Robert Stevenson required keepers to stay with the light and not risk rescuing shipwrecked people. It seems that even with the light, ships could still be driven ashore. She accessed the full entries of logs and diaries available at the Northern Lights Board.

Earthquake shocks were sometimes reported and Tarbat Ness once shook so that the shades and lamp glasses rattled.

Probably the lighthouse was built on the foundations of a Roman fortification, that were later identified in the Middle Ages as a "Roman landmark" near Port a' Chait (now called "Port a Chaistell").

See also

 List of lighthouses in Scotland
 List of Northern Lighthouse Board lighthouses
List of Category A listed buildings in Highland

References

External links

 Northern Lighthouse Board 
 Northern Lighthouse Board history of Tarbat Ness 
 CANMORE: Port a chaistell

Lighthouses completed in 1830
Category A listed lighthouses
Category A listed buildings in Highland (council area)
Lighthouses in Scotland
Ross and Cromarty
Buildings and structures in Highland (council area)
1830 establishments in Scotland
Works of Robert Stevenson (civil engineer)